Lehreijat  is a village and rural commune in the Tintane department of Mauritania. In the 2013 census, it had a population of 13, 915.

References

Communes of Mauritania